Negeri Sembilan (Negeri Sembilan Malay: Nogoghi Sombilan, Nismilan) is a state in Malaysia which lies on the western coast of Peninsular Malaysia. It borders Selangor on the north, Pahang in the east, and Malacca and Johor to the south.

The name is believed to derive from the nine (sembilan) villages or nagari in the Minangkabau language (now known as luak) settled by the Minangkabau, a people originally from West Sumatra (in present-day Indonesia). Minangkabau features are still visible today in traditional architecture and the dialect of Malay spoken.

Unlike the hereditary monarchs of the other royal Malay states, the ruler of Negeri Sembilan is elected and is known as Yang di-Pertuan Besar instead of Sultan. The election of the Ruler is also unique. He is elected by the council of Undangs who lead the four biggest territories of Sungai Ujong, Jelebu, Johol, and Rembau, from the legitimate male members of the Pagaruyung Dynasty, with the surviving sons of the previous Yantuam coming first in the considerations but not being obligatory to be voted on, making it one of the more democratic monarchies.

The capital of Negeri Sembilan is Seremban.  The royal capital is Seri Menanti in Kuala Pilah District. Other important towns are Port Dickson, Bahau and Nilai.

The Arabic honorific title of the state is Darul Khusus ("the Special Abode").

Etymology
The name Negeri Sembilan is believed to derive from the nine (sembilan) chiefdoms or Nogoghi in the Negeri Sembilan dialect (now known as luak) settled by the Minangkabau. The size of Negeri Sembilan is now smaller than the original size of Negeri Sembilan.

History

Ancient and medieval history
The earliest inhabitants of Negeri Sembilan were the ancestors of the Semelai, Semai, Semang, and Jakun peoples, who lived either as hunter-gatherer nomads or as subsistence farmers.

Parameswara reportedly visited the settlement of Sening Ujong, which was located in what is now Seremban.

The Minangkabaus from Sumatra settled in what is today Negeri Sembilan in the 15th century under the protection of the Malacca Sultanate, and later under the protection of its successor, the Sultanate of Johor. They also brought their matrilineal custom, known as Adat Perpatih, with them and made it the local custom.

The Linggi River along the western part of the state, and the Muar River were used as one of the main trade routes since the time of the Malacca Sultanate. With the Pahang River in just a walking distance to the east, the three rivers formed the Laluan Penarikan (Portage Route), which ensured easier access between the Strait of Malacca and the South China Sea.

As Johor weakened in the 18th century, attacks by the Bugis forced the Minangkabaus to seek protection from their homeland. The Minangkabau ruler, Sultan Abdul Jalil, obliged by sending his near relative, Raja Mahmud, also known as Raja Melewar. When he arrived, he found that another royal, Raja Khatib had already established himself as ruler. He declared war against Raja Khatib and became the ruler of Negeri Sembilan. The Sultan of Johor confirmed his position by granting the title Yamtuan Seri Menanti (He Who is Highest Lord of the Seri Menanti) in 1773.

Negeri Sembilan, at the dawn of her establishment, was originally a loose confederation consisting of nine luaks, hence the name. At the time of Raja Melewar's accession, it used to cover a larger area than its modern-day boundaries. Besides the entirety of modern day Negeri Sembilan, it also spanned parts of what is today Selangor, Malacca, Pahang and Johor. The original nine chiefdoms or domains in 1773 that made up the first incarnation of Negeri Sembilan and gave the state its name are namely Sungai Ujong, Jelebu, Rembau, Johol, Jelai, Ulu Pahang, Naning, Segamat and Klang. The latter four chiefdoms were annexed into neighbouring states in the 19th century. Naning was annexed into the Straits Settlement of Malacca in 1832 following the Naning War; Ulu Pahang became Bera region of Pahang, Segamat annexed into Johor and Klang became Kuala Langat region of Selangor.

After Raja Melewar's death, a series of disputes arose over the succession. For a considerable period, the local nobles applied to the Minangkabau ruler in Sumatra for a ruler. However, competing interests supported different candidates, often resulting in instability and civil war.

Colonial history

In 1874, the British intervened militarily in a leadership tussle in Sungai Ujong to preserve British economic interests, and placed the domain under the control of a British Resident. Jelebu followed in 1883 and Rembau in 1887. The formation of modern Negeri Sembilan began in 1889, when the Seri Menanti domain, under the rule of Tuanku Muhammad (son of Yamtuan Antah), combined with the domains of Tampin and Rembau, forming the Seri Menanti Confederation as a single political entity. The domains of Sungai Ujong and Jelebu joined this confederation in 1895, forming the state of Negeri Sembilan in its modern borders. Martin Lister became the new state's first Resident, and Negeri Sembilan became part of the Federated Malay States the same year.

The number of states within Negeri Sembilan has fluctuated over the years, the federation now consists of six states and a number of sub-states under their suzerainty.

Modern history
Negeri Sembilan endured Japanese occupation in World War II between 1942 and 1945, joined the Federation of Malaya in 1948, and became a state of Malaysia in 1963.

In the 1990s and 2000s, Seremban and Nilai attracted people who moved in from the overcrowded towns of the Klang Valley. These two cities also became the sites of new factories and industrial parks, accelerating the development of the state into modern times.

On 9 September 2009, the Ministry of Housing and Local Government approved the state capital of Seremban's application to become a city (Bandar Raya), as it had attracted enough people to become large. In order for that to happen, its city council had to be merged with the Nilai Municipal Council. After several times when it was postponed, Seremban achieved the status of a city on 20 January 2020. Later that year on 9 November, Negeri Sembilan was subjected to the Movement Control Order lockdown due to increasing COVID-19 infections.

Geography

Facing the Strait of Malacca, Negeri Sembilan is one of the  West Coast states of Peninsular Malaysia, and is specifically belong to the southern region, along with Malacca and Johor,  although some sources define Negeri Sembilan as a central region state with Selangor and the federal territories of Kuala Lumpur and Putrajaya. Roughly the same size as Selangor, Negeri Sembilan wields a total land area of 6,686 km² (430 sq mi). It is the fourth smallest state in Malaysia by area as well as the second largest in the southern region behind Johor. 

On the administrative level, Negeri Sembilan consists of seven districts, namely Port Dickson, Seremban, Rembau, Kuala Pilah, Jelebu, Jempol and Tampin Districts, and further sectioned into 14 respective luaks. The following luaks are Sungai Ujong, Rembau, Jelebu, Johol, Tampin, Ulu Muar, Terachi, Inas, Jempol, Gunung Pasir, Gemencheh, Pasir Besar, Air Kuning, and Linggi. Sungai Ujong, Rembau, Johol and Jelebu are governed by the Undangs, thus they are  known as the Luak Berundang. In addition, Johol also holds suzerainty over Pasir Besar, Gemencheh and Air Kuning. Luaks that surround Seri Menanti such as Terachi, Ulu Muar, Jempol, Gunung Pasir and Inas are collectively known as the Luak Tanah Mengandung. The Luak of Tampin, also known as the Adat Territory of Tampin (Malay: Wilayah Adat Tampin) is autonomous and is ruled by the Tunku Besar. 

The topological profile of Negeri Sembilan is composed of two vast plains divided by a mountainous spine in the middle, well drained by various rivers.  The Titiwangsa Mountains, the southernmost extension of the Tenasserim Hills and the wider Indo-Malayan Cordillera, spans for approximately 92 km through the middle of the state from the   border tripoint with Pahang and Selangor near Kenaboi, Jelebu towards Tampin, close to the border with Malacca. For this reason, this results in the state being bisected into two regions, namely western Negeri Sembilan - consisting of Port Dickson, Seremban and Rembau Districts; and eastern Negeri Sembilan, which covers the districts of Jelebu, Kuala Pilah, Jempol and Tampin. The western half seems to be more developed and has an intricate and concentrated road network than the latter, which is much more rural. The Negri stretch of the Titiwangsa Mountains is also part of the Titiwangsa Forest Complex, a component of the Central Forest Spine conservation area that covers much of the heavily forested and mountainous interior of Peninsular Malaysia.

The state is mostly drained by the Linggi and Muar Rivers. The Linggi River basin constitutes much of western Negeri Sembilan, while the Muar River mostly flows through the state's eastern half. Both rivers are the major sources of water supply for much of the state's populace .

Climate

Government

Constitution
The Constitution of Negeri Sembilan came into force on 26 March 1959. It is divided into two sections. The constitution establishes that the state's form of government is constitutional monarchy and the world's only elective monarchy for matrilineal society.  The system was partially the basis for the federal monarchy.

The Ruler

The official constitutional title of the Ruler of the state are Duli Yang Maha Mulia Yang di-Pertuan Besar Negeri Sembilan, (currently Duli Yang Maha Mulia Yang di-Pertuan Besar Negeri Sembilan Darul Khusus Tuanku Muhriz ibni Almarhum Tuanku Munawir), Yang Teramat Mulia Undang of Sungei Ujong, Yang Teramat Mulia Undang of Jelebu, Yang Teramat Mulia Undang of Johol, Yang Teramat Mulia Undang of Rembau and Yang Teramat Mulia Tengku Besar Tampin and they holds office for life.

The state's constitution proclaims the Yang di-Pertuan Besar, Undang of Sungei Ujong, Undang of Jelebu, Undang of Johol, Undang of Rembau and Tengku Besar Tampin are vested with the Executive Power of the state, are the Head of the Religion of Islam in the state and are the fountain of all honour and dignity for the state. The current Yang di-Pertuan Besar is His Royal Highness Tuanku Muhriz ibni Almarhum Tuanku Munawir. His Royal Highness succeeds Almarhum Tuanku Jaafar Ibni Almarhum Tuanku Abdul Rahman who died on 27 December 2008.

Unlike Malaysia's eight other Royal Malay states, the Ruler of Negeri Sembilan is elected to his office by the territorial chiefs or Ruling Chiefs of the state. These Ruling Chiefs are titled Undang. Only four of the Undangs have the right to vote in the election for the Ruler of the State. They are:

The Undang of Sungai Ujong
The Undang of Jelebu
The Undang of Johol
The Undang of Rembau

The Undang themselves cannot stand for election, and their choice of Ruler is limited to a male Muslim who is Malay and also a "lawfully begotten descendant of Raja Radin ibni Raja Lenggang".

The Assembly convenes at the Wisma Negeri in the state capital, Seremban.

Executive and Legislature 

The State Executive Council consists of the Menteri Besar, who is its chairman, and ten other members. The Menteri Besar and the other members of the council are appointed by the Yang Di-Pertuan Besar from the members of the State Assembly of the governing party or coalition. The current Menteri Besar or Chief Minister of the state is Aminuddin Harun.

The unicameral Negeri Sembilan State Legislative Assembly is the state legislature of Negeri Sembilan. It consists of 36 members who represent single-member constituencies throughout the state. Elections are held no more than five years apart, and are usually conducted simultaneously with elections to the federal parliament.

Departments
 Negeri Sembilan State Financial Office
 Negeri Sembilan Public Works Department
 Office of Lands and Mines Negeri Sembilan
 Negeri Sembilan Irrigation and Drainage Department
 Negeri Sembilan State Forestry Department
 Negeri Sembilan State Agriculture Department
 Negeri Sembilan Social Welfare Department
 Negeri Sembilan Town and Country Planning Department
 Department of Veterinary Services of Negeri Sembilan
 Negeri Sembilan State Mufti Department
 Negeri Sembilan State Islamic Religious Affairs Department
 Negeri Sembilan Syariah Judiciary Department

Statutory bodies
 Negeri Sembilan State Islamic Religious Council
 Negeri Sembilan State Museum Board
 Negeri Sembilan Public Library Corporation
 Negeri Sembilan Foundation
 Negeri Sembilan State Development Corporation

Administrative divisions

The state comprises 7 districts, which in turn divided into 61 mukims.

It originally consisted of 9 districts:
Jelai (Inas)
Jelebu
Johol
Klang (now a district in Selangor)
Naning (now in Malacca)
Rembau
Segamat (now in Johor) / Pasir Besar (now in Tampin)
Sungai Ujong
Alu Panah (now divided between Jelebu and Pahang State)

Demographics

Ethnicity
Negeri Sembilan has a collective population of 1,098,500 as of 2015; the ethnic composition consisting of Malays 622,000 (56.6%) (mostly are Minangkabau descent), other Bumiputras 20,700 (1.9%), Chinese 234,300 (21.3%), Indian 154,000 (14%), Others 4,200 (0.4%), and Non Citizens 63,300 (5.8%). The state has the highest percentage of Indians when compared to other Malaysian states. Up until today the state is known as the strongholds of Adat Perpatih in Malaysia.

Religion

According to the 2010 census, the population of Negeri Sembilan is 60.3% Muslim, 21.2% Buddhist, 13.4% Hindu, 2.4% Christian, 1.1% of unknown affiliation, 0.8% non-religious, 0.5% Taoist or Chinese religion follower, and 0.3% of followers of other religions.

Statistics from the 2010 Census indicate that 92.9% of the Chinese population in Negeri Sembilan is identified as Buddhists, with significant minority of adherents identifying as Christians (3.6%), Chinese folk religions (1.9%) and Muslims (0.8%). The majority of the Indian population are Hindus (89.0%), with a significant minorities of numbers identifying as Christians (5.0%), Muslims (3.2%) and Buddhists (1.4%). The non-Malay Bumiputera community are predominantly Atheists (39.7%), with significant minorities identifying as Christians (28.3%) and Muslims (20.2%). All Malays are Muslims.

Languages
Negeri Sembilan is a multiethnic state in which every ethnic group speaks their respective languages and dialects. The Negeri Sembilanese people speak a unique variety of Malay known as Negeri Sembilan Malay or in their native language as Baso Nogoghi. It is not closely related to other varieties of Malay in Peninsular Malaysia but more closely related with Malay varieties spoken in neighbouring Sumatra especially varieties of Minangkabau. Besides Malays, the Chinese community also speak their languages and dialects. Orang Asli peoples like Temuans speak a language closely related to Malay. Standard Malay is widely used throughout the state.

Tamil (mother tongue to Indian Tamils and Ceylon Tamils) is used as a lingua franca among the other minor Indian communities. Besides, a small number of Telugu, Malayalam and Punjabi exist in the towns of Negeri Sembilan.

Economy 

The state's manufacturing sector contributes almost half of the state's gross domestic product (GDP), followed by services and tourism (40.3%), agriculture (6%), construction (2.2%) and mining (0.3%). Manufacturing activities include electrical supplies and electronics, textiles, furniture, chemicals, machinery, metal works and rubber products.  The main industrial areas in Negeri Sembilan include Senawang, Bandar Sri Sendayan, Sungai Gadut, Bandar Enstek and Nilai in Seremban, Tanah Merah in Port Dickson and Chembong in Rembau. Notable companies also set up their plants in Negeri Sembilan, such as Kellogg's, Dutch Lady, Ajinomoto and Coca-Cola in Bandar Enstek, Hino Motors in Bandar Sri Sendayan, Yakult in Seremban 2, Samsung SDI, Onsemi and NXP Semiconductors in Senawang, and Nestlé in Chembong. Nestlé's Chembong plant is also the largest Milo manufacturer in the world, as well as the company's largest global centre of excellence.

Negeri Sembilan is mainly an agricultural state. However, the establishment of several industrial estates enhanced the manufacturing sector as a significant contributor to the state economy. Two districts in the western half of the state - Seremban and Port Dickson - have been gazetted as part of the Malaysia Vision Valley (MVV, Malay: Lembah Wawasan Malaysia), a 1530 sq km new growth corridor conceived from the joint venture between Sime Darby and both the federal and state governments in 2015 as part of the National Transformation Agenda, the National Physical Plan (NPP), the Eleventh Malaysia Plan (11MP) and the 2045 Negeri Sembilan Structural Plan, in order to evenly balancing the existing development in the neighbouring Klang Valley area, providing ample space for the southern extension of the Greater Kuala Lumpur area, as well as to transform Negeri Sembilan into a developed state by 2045. As of 2022, the MVV is now in its second iteration, and is still undergoing development. Meanwhile, districts east of the MVV - Rembau, Kuala Pilah, Tampin and Jempol - are yet to be developed into an agropolis, to boost foodstuff production in the state and national levels respectively.
 
The agricultural activity includes rubber and oil palm plantations, livestock, fruit orchards and vegetable farming. About 3,099 square kilometres are used for rubber and oil palm plantations.

Culture
The Minangkabau people brought along with them a cultural heritage which is still preserved and practised today as the adat perpatih, a matrilineal system of inheritance and administration that is unique to the state, where the husband is the head of the household and inheritance passes from the mother to the daughter. The Minangkabaus in Negeri Sembilan are divided into twelve suku (clans). Each of these suku is led by a chief, known as the Lembaga. Each suku is broken down into subunits known as the Perut, where each of them are led by a chief, either known as a Buapak (male) or Ibu Soko (female). Both the Buapak and Ibu Soko play a vital role as people to refer to regarding the adat and religious matters among the subordinates of the Perut, known as  Anak Buah. Marriage between members of the same clan is forbidden.  The twelve suku are known as the following, of which the names of each suku indicates the area where they hailed:
 Biduanda
 Seri Lemak
 Seri Melenggang
 Anak Aceh
 Anak Melaka
 Tiga Nenek
 Tiga Batu
 Tanah Datar
Batu Hampar
Payakumbuh
Batu Belang
Mungkal

One perbilangan (customary poetry) sums up the traditional administrative system of the state:

Alam beraja,  
Luak berpenghulu,
Suku berlembaga,
Anak buah berbuapak. 

The Minangkabau influence in the state can be found in dances and food as well.

Performing arts
Negeri Sembilan also has traditional music like the Caklempong, Dikir Rebana, Tumbuk Kalang, and Bongai.

The musical instruments used to bear some semblance to Sumatra, the ancestral home of the Minangkabau people. Dances like the tarian lilin (candle dance) and rentak kuda (the beat of the horse) are popular in Negeri Sembilan and the coordinated movements of the dancers in their colorful costumes in the Tarian Piring and the upbeat tempo of Tarian Randai. Unlike modern dance, each beat, rhythm and movement in these dances combines to form a story, maybe of a bygone myth or simply a reflection of the lifestyles of another era.

They are usually performed at traditional festivities, cultural events and dinner-cum-cultural shows.

Transportation

As in most other Asian cities, driving is the main choice in the state. there are three expressways serving the state, which are PLUS Highway, LEKAS Highway and Seremban–Port Dickson Highway. Public transportation covers a variety of transport modes such as bus, rail and taxi.

For the bus services, it is operated by myBAS in the state. There are also free bus services in Seremban provided by the state government. Seremban has a main bus station which is Terminal One which connects Seremban with major places in Negeri Sembilan such as Kuala Pilah, Bahau, Rembau and Malaysia such as Alor Setar, Ipoh and Melaka. All bus companies that provide bus services are based here.

For the rail services, Seremban Railway Station is the main station to the state capital - Seremban and part of the Klang Valley Integrated Transit System, while Gemas Railway Station in Tampin District is the interchange between West Coast and East Coast Line. The KTM Komuter, a commuter rail service, was introduced in 1995 as the first rail transit system to provide local rail services from Negeri Sembilan to Kuala Lumpur and the surrounding Klang Valley suburban areas. KTM Komuter's 175 km (109 mi) network in the Central Sector has 53 stations. It consists of two cross-city routes, namely the Port Klang Line (Tanjung Malim to Port Klang) and Seremban Line (Batu Caves to Pulau Sebang/Tampin).

There are no civil airports in the state, while the nearest airport, Kuala Lumpur International Airport (KLIA) at Sepang, Selangor can be accessed via shuttle bus between Nilai Komuter station to the airport.

Cuisine

Traditional Negeri Sembilan food is typically very hot and spicy, as one of the ingredients used is the cili padi, one of the hottest types of chili peppers. Masak lemak cili api, a type of gulai made with turmeric and cili padi-infused coconut milk (santan), is a trademark dish in the cuisine of the state. The Negeri Sembilanese are also known for their penchant for smoked foods (known as salai in Malay), with examples include sembilang salai (smoked catfish), ayam salai (smoked chicken), etc., and these can also be cooked masak lemak cili api-style. 

Rendang, which is a rich dish of dry braised meat with herbs, spices and coconut milk, is also a well known fare in Negeri Sembilan, and there are variations of it according to the districts where the rendang originated, such as rendang maman from Gemencheh in Tampin District, made with maman leaves. Another Negeri Sembilan speciality is lemang, glutinous rice cooked in coconut milk in a bamboo stem over an open fire. This is normally served with rendang.

Tourism

Attractions in Negeri Sembilan include:
Galeri Diraja Tuanku Ja'afar - is a gallery in Seremban, Negeri Sembilan, Malaysia. The gallery is about the former Negeri Sembilan Yang di-Pertuan Besar Tuanku Ja'afar.
Port Dickson – A famous weekend retreat for city dwellers, said to have been named after British officer John Frederick Dickson in 1889. Port Dickson is  known for its high-end hotel establishments, army bases, pristine beaches facing the Strait of Malacca, and a lot more. 
 Seri Menanti Royal Museum – Originally a palace for the Negeri Sembilan Royal family until 1992, this five-storey wooden palace was built using no nails or screws. The palace exhibits costumes, weaponry, bed chambers as well as documents on the royal lineage on display in the museum
 Army Museum – Located in the Port Dickson suburb of Sirusa, it is the largest military museum in Malaysia. The Army Museum (Malay: Muzium Tentera Darat) exhibits artefacts in regards to the history of the Malaysian Army.
 Mount Datuk - Located in Rembau, this 884-metre peak provides a good work out and excellent views from the top, which also include the Strait of Malacca, visible from the peak on a clear day. It is easily accessible via a day trip from Kuala Lumpur.
It is even closer to Kuala Lumpur and is a popular climbing spot. The mountain is located on the border between Seremban and Kuala Pilah Districts.
 Lukut Fort and Museum - In Lukut, the tourists can wander among the hilltop remains of a 19th-century fort before visiting the neighbouring Lukut Museum which contains a Lukut Historical Gallery and other interesting artefacts.
 Penarikan Portage - the spot close to Bahau town is Jalan Penarikan where boats were carried over the short gap between eastbound and westbound rivers of the Malay Peninsula allowing movement between both coasts of the peninsula. It is described as the first east–west land route in Malaysian history.
 Teratak Za'aba - Pendeta Za'aba, whose real name was Zainal Abidin Ahmad, was a renowned Malay scholar and linguist who contributed a lot in shaping the modern Malay language. This museum, dedicated to him, is located at his birthplace in Kampung Bukit Kerdas, Batu Kikir near Bahau.
 Megalithic sites - Negeri Sembilan is home to a number of megalithic sites of historical significance, such as in Terachi in Kuala Pilah District, Repah in Tampin District and Pengkalan Kempas in Port Dickson District. 
 Gemencheh Bridge (Sungai Kelamah) Memorial - This memorial marks the site of a battle at Gemencheh Bridge during World War II where Allied forces ambushed advancing Japanese troops. Many people died here.
 Gemas Railway Museum - Gemas, Tampin District is a town known for being located on the junction between the east coast and west coast lines of the Keretapi Tanah Melayu Berhad's (KTMB) railway network. Previously, the museum's building was the former Gemas railway station, which ceased operations in 2013 after 91 years of service, coincident to the completion of the new station building, as part of the electrification and double tracking of the Seremban-Gemas section of the West Coast Line.
 Pasoh Caves - Located in Pasoh Forest Reserve, Jelebu, the Pasoh Caves complex holds the distinction of being the southernmost karst cave in Peninsular Malaysia as well as the first Paleolithic site discovered in the southern region, following the discovery of some artifacts as old as 14,000 years, in an excavation conducted by the Science University of Malaysia (USM).
 Batu Maloi Cave - Located in Johol, Kuala Pilah District, the Batu Maloi Cave is a 2.4-kilometre long talus cave made up of fallen boulders of granite with a river flowing through it. Said to be the longest granite cave in Malaysia, and is popular among cavers.
 Kenaboi State Park - Located in Jelebu, Kenaboi State Park is nestled in the lush million-year old rainforest and peaks of the Titiwangsa Mountains. The nature reserve is famous for being the main entry point to the tallest mountain in Negeri Sembilan, Mount Besar Hantu (1,462 m) and natural landmarks such as Lata Kijang, Lata Dinding and Lata Berungut. 
 Mount Tampin - Located in Tampin in the southern corner of the state, Mount Tampin is the geographical southern terminus of the Titiwangsa Mountains, at an elevation of 764 m.

Education 
Negeri Sembilan has several tertiary education institutions. Most of these education institutions are concentrated in major towns in Negeri Sembilan. The list below represents public and private university based in Negeri Sembilan state:

Public universities

Private universities and university colleges

Health care 
There are public hospitals and private hospitals in Negeri Sembilan:

Public Hospitals
 Hospital Tuanku Jaafar, Seremban
 Hospital Tuanku Ampuan Najihah, Kuala Pilah
 Hospital Port Dickson
 Hospital Tampin
 Hospital Jelebu
 Hospital Jempol
 Hospital Rembau

Private Hospitals
 Nilai Medical Centre
 Seremban Specialist Hospital
 Columbia Asia Medical Centre - Seremban
 Senawang Specialist Hospital
 NSCMH Medical Centre
 Columbia Asia Hospital
 Mawar Medical Centre

See also 

 Overseas Minangkabau

References

External links 

Official site of Negeri Sembilan State Government
Tourism Malaysia – Negeri Sembilan
Negeri Sembilan travel guide written and maintained by locals

 
Peninsular Malaysia
States of Malaysia
Minangkabau
Strait of Malacca